Armored Car is a 1937 American crime film directed by Lewis R. Foster and written by Lewis R. Foster and Robert N. Lee. The film stars Robert Wilcox, Judith Barrett, Cesar Romero, Irving Pichel, David Oliver and William Lundigan. The film was released on June 1, 1937, by Universal Pictures.

Plot
The plot is built around detective Larry Wills, who goes undercover to dismantle a group of hijackers.

Cast        
Robert Wilcox as Larry Wills
Judith Barrett as Ella Logan
Cesar Romero as Petack
Irving Pichel as Walinsky
David Oliver as Bubbles
William Lundigan as Henry Hutchins 
J. Anthony Hughes as Bill Wane 
Tom Kennedy as Tiny
Harry Davenport as Pop Logan
Inez Courtney as Blind Date
Rollo Lloyd as Organist
Richard Tucker as John Hale
John Kelly as Frenchie
Joe King as Sheridan
Paul Fix as Slim
Jack Powell as Fat

References

External links
 

1937 films
American crime drama films
1937 crime drama films
Universal Pictures films
Films directed by Lewis R. Foster
American black-and-white films
1930s English-language films
1930s American films